The Dr. Martin Luther King Jr. Medical Campus High School is a high school in Buffalo, New York. It is located at 487 High Street and serves Grades 9 through 12.

History 
The first school building built on High Street was constructed in 1885, with a two-story brick addition constructed four years later. The current building structure was completed in 1926 and would be renovated and renamed the Dr. Martin Luther King Jr. Multicultural Institute in 1968, then renovated again in 2006. During that renovation, the MLK School was housed at the former Follow Through Magnet School #8. In 2014, the Dr. Martin Luther King Multicultural Institute was closed to place the new high school.

High schools in Buffalo, New York